Naleya Downer (born 27 January 1980) is a retired female track and field sprinter from Jamaica, who competed in the 400 metres and the 400 metres hurdles during her career. Her personal best time in the women's 400 metres is 52.61, set on 4 May 2002 in Austin, Texas. She won a silver medal in the women's 4x400 metres relay at the 2003 Pan American Games, alongside Michelle Burgher, Novlene Williams, and Allison Beckford.

She ran track for the University of Texas at Austin.

Achievements

References

1980 births
Living people
Jamaican female sprinters
Jamaican female hurdlers
Athletes (track and field) at the 2003 Pan American Games
Texas Longhorns women's track and field athletes
Pan American Games medalists in athletics (track and field)
Pan American Games silver medalists for Jamaica
Medalists at the 2003 Pan American Games
20th-century Jamaican women
21st-century Jamaican women